The Ikarus S-49 was a Yugoslav single-seat, single-engine fighter aircraft built for the Yugoslav Air Force shortly after World War II. Following the Tito–Stalin Split in 1948, the Yugoslav Air Force was left with an aircraft inventory consisting of mostly Soviet aircraft. Unable to acquire new aircraft or spare parts for its existing fleet, they turned to its domestic aviation industry in order to create an indigenous design to fulfill the need for additional aircraft.

The result was the S-49A, designed by Kosta Sivčev, Svetozar Popović and Slobodan Zrnić, on the basis of the pre-war Rogožarski IK-3. The S-49A was surpassed by the improved S-49C, featuring an all-metal construction and a more powerful engine. A total of 45 S-49A and 113 S-49C were produced by the Ikarus Aircraft Factory in Zemun. The last aircraft were retired from service in 1960/61, having been replaced by more modern jet-powered aircraft.

Development
After the Resolution of Informbiro in 1948 and the resulting breakup with the Soviet Union, Yugoslavia was forced to rely on its domestic military industry. The same constructors that built the Rogozarski IK-3 (designers Ljubomir Ilic, Kosta Sivcev, Slobodan Zrnic) before the war, engineers Kosta Sivcev, Slobodan Zrnic and Svetozar K. Popovic, used existing technical documentation of the IK-3 to construct a new fighter aircraft, the  Ikarus S-49. The first prototype of the S-49A flew in June 1949. The first operational aircraft were delivered to combat units at the beginning of 1950.

Description 
The S-49A was of mixed construction, with Soviet built VK-105 engines which were no longer available after 1948. Therefore, it was decided to produce a new version of the aircraft powered by the similar French Hispano-Suiza 12Z-17 engine. Because of the bigger and heavier engine, the new aircraft had to be of all-metal construction with a much longer nose. While the aircraft was mainly built by Ikarus, the wings and tail were built by the SOKO factory in Mostar.  The armament remained the same as with the Ikarus S-49A and it consisted of one 20 mm Mauser MG-151/20 autocannon produced by Germany during World War II and two 12.7 mm Colt Browning machine guns. In addition, under wing racks for two 50 kg bombs or four 127 mm HVAR missiles were provided.

Operational 
At the beginning of 1952, the Ikarus S-49C was introduced into the units of the Yugoslav Air Force. About 130 S-49C were produced during the 1950s and they remained in service until 1961.

Variants
 S-49A - mixed construction and Klimov M-105 engine (45 built)
 S-49B - planned version powered by a Daimler-Benz engine; unbuilt.
 S-49C - all-metal construction and Hispano-Suiza 12Z engine (113 built)

Operators

  - Yugoslav Air Force
 Ikarus S-49A - 46 aircraft (1949–1957)
 117th Fighter Aviation Regiment (1950–1953)
 204th Fighter Aviation Regiment (1950–1953)
 107th Fighter Aviation Regiment (1953–1957)
 Training Squadron of 44th Aviation Division (1953–1954)
 Ikarus S-49C - 112 aircraft (1952–1961)
 116th Fighter Aviation Regiment (1952–1960)
 185th Fighter Aviation Regiment (1953–1956)
 40th Fighter Aviation Regiment (1955–1959)
 109th Fighter Aviation Regiment (1956–1960)
 88th Fighter Aviation Regiment (1957–1959)
 Training Squadron of 39th Aviation Division (1953–1959) S-49C

Aircraft on display
Serbia
 Museum of Aviation (Belgrade) in Belgrade
Both variants of S-49A and C are on display.

Specifications (Ikarus S-49C)

See also

References

Bibliography
 

1940s Yugoslav fighter aircraft
Ikarus aircraft
Low-wing aircraft
Single-engined tractor aircraft
Aircraft first flown in 1949